British teenager Lesley Whittle was kidnapped on 14 January 1975, and her body discovered on 7 March 1975. Her kidnapping and murder dominated national headlines for 11 months. The investigation involved over 400 officers from the West Mercia Constabulary, Staffordshire and West Midlands police forces and the Metropolitan Police.

Whittle, aged 17, was kidnapped from her home in Highley, Shropshire, by Donald Neilson, who by that time had committed over 400 burglaries and three murders. He was known to the British press as "the Black Panther", for the black balaclava he wore during robberies of post offices.

Neilson held Whittle in an underground drainage shaft of a reservoir at Bathpool Park in Kidsgrove, Staffordshire. He had placed a hood over her head, left her naked, and tethered her to the side of the shaft by a wire noose. After what was later seen as a bungled police operation, including two failed attempts to engage with Neilson's demand for a ransom of £50,000, her body was found hanging in the shaft on 7 March 1975.

After being arrested 11 months later in Mansfield, in July 1976 at Oxford Crown Court Neilson was convicted of the kidnapping and murder of Whittle, for which he was sentenced to life imprisonment. Three weeks later he was convicted of the murder of three post office workers, and given three further life sentences.

Lesley Whittle
Lesley Whittle, born in 1957, was the daughter of George Whittle, a co-owner of Whittle Coaches, and his girlfriend Dorothy. At the time of her kidnapping, she was a student at Wulfrun College, Wolverhampton.

Background

To avoid estate taxes, George Whittle gave three houses plus £70,000 in cash to Dorothy, £107,000 to his son Ronald, and £82,000 to Lesley during his life. He died in 1970, aged 65. He had left nothing to his estranged wife, Selina Whittle, and Selina began legal proceedings in May 1972 to obtain money from her husband's estate. The story was picked up by the Daily Express.

Kidnapping
Police subsequently found that ex-British Army soldier Neilson had put three years of planning into the kidnapping, after reading a 1972 news article pertaining to inheritance Dorothy had been bequeathed when her father had died. While in need of money, Neilson read about the dispute between Whittle and Selina. He decided he was going to kidnap either Ronald or Dorothy Whittle and hold them until a £50,000 ransom had been paid. He had estimated that the Whittles could easily afford £50,000. He planned the kidnap to take place in January 1974, but delayed it by 12 months; due to the petrol shortages of the three-day week, Neilson would have drawn attention to himself by driving long distances from his home in Bradford. 

On 14 January 1975, Dorothy Whittle returned to the house in Highley, Shropshire, at 1:30 am. Having found her daughter asleep in bed, Dorothy took two sleeping tablets and went to bed herself. Neilson later cut the telephone line (suspecting a burglar alarm) and then entered the Whittles' home through the garage. Encountering Lesley by mistake, he decided to kidnap her instead. Gagging the teenager, who was wearing only her dressing gown and slippers, he took her to his green Morris 1100 car, where he tied her up and laid her down on the back seat.

Neilson then drove Lesley to Bathpool Park in Kidsgrove, Staffordshire. There he forced her down into the drainage shaft of the nearby reservoir. Inside the shaft he placed a hood over her head, removed the dressing gown, leaving her naked, and then tethered her to the side of the shaft by a wire noose. There was a mattress and a sleeping bag.

The following morning, after her daughter failed to come down for breakfast, Dorothy discovered in Lesley's bedroom that her daughter's clothes for that day were untouched and a ransom note punched out on a 6 ft strip of Dymotape. It demanded £50,000 and instructed the family not to contact the police, but to wait for a telephone call at a phonebox at the Swan shopping centre in Kidderminster that evening. Dorothy picked up her home telephone to ring Lesley's brother Ronald, but on finding it dead, rushed in her dressing gown to her car. She drove to Ronald's house and then returned with Ronald and his wife, Gaynor, back to the Whittle family home, where they found a second copy of the Dymotape ransom note tucked inside a box of Turkish delight in the lounge. After finding that Lesley's dressing gown and slippers were missing, confirming that she had been kidnapped, Ronald Whittle immediately called the police.

Investigation
An investigation led by Detective Chief Superintendent Robert Booth of West Mercia Police, with assistance from Scotland Yard, sent a team led by Commander John Morrison that included DCI Walter Boreham. The investigation at its height involved over 250 officers from the West Mercia, Staffordshire and West Midlands police forces, plus Scotland Yard; however, it was delayed by a series of police bungles and other circumstances.

The story quickly leaked to the press, and was carried on the evening television news that day. No telephone call came to the Swan shopping centre phonebox in Kidderminster, until 1 am on 15 January. Neilson had been unaware of the news broadcast.

At 11:45 pm on 16 January, in a tape played by Neilson over the telephone, a message recorded by Lesley told her family that she was alright, and that someone from her family was to go to the phonebox in Kidsgrove to retrieve a second message that was behind the back-board of the phonebox. Verifying the voice as Lesley's, it was agreed that Ronald Whittle would undertake the drop, monitored by a police radio network that could give him assistance within two minutes. After the police had taken two hours to make extensive arrangements, Ronald left Bridgnorth police station at 1:30 am on 17 January, with a suitcase packed with £50,000 to drive to Kidsgrove. But being unfamiliar with the area he got lost, eventually arriving at Kidsgrove Post Office phonebox late. The message instructed him to:

Arriving at Bathpool Park 90 minutes late, Ronald turned into the "No Entry" sign as instructed, but in the dark he did not see the low wall that edged the railway bridge, and drove to the end of the lane. He stopped, flashed his lights and then got out of the car and shouted; there was no-one there. Ronald left the park and met up again with the police at an arranged meeting point. West Mercia police officers put the blame for the failed operation onto Staffordshire Police, after a patrol car was seen driving through the area. A courting couple in a car had also parked near where the ransom was to have been left. A subsequent search of Bathpool Park by police revealed no clues.

A week later, West Midlands Police contacted West Mercia. On the same night of the failed ransom drop, a car had been left near the Dudley Freightliner Terminal, where security guard Gerald Smith had been shot in the back six times, and was now in hospital recovering. In the car were a cassette tape with Lesley Whittle's voice on it, asking her relatives to co-operate with the kidnapper, her slippers, and a roll of plastic tape, all of which linked Neilson to the kidnapping. Ballistics evidence and fingerprints on the cartridges also linked the same man to the Freightliner shooting, the previous post office robberies and thus the Black Panther murders.

On 10 February 1975, the news blackout was lifted. On 5 March, Chief Superintendent Booth and Ronald Whittle appeared together on both national and local television. On the next day, a headmaster at a local school told police that a pupil had brought him a piece of Dymotape that read "DROP SUITCASE INTO HOLE" and, subsequently, other pupils had found a torch wedged in the grilles of what was locally known as the "glory-hole", one of the capped ventilation shafts of the old Harecastle Tunnel. The boys who found the torch in Bathpool Park had given it to the headmaster several weeks earlier, but neither had realised the significance of the find until the television broadcast.

On 6 March 1975, police began a second thorough search of Bathpool Park, starting with the glory-hole, within which a detective constable found a Dymotape machine and a roll of Dymotape. An inspection of the second shaft revealed nothing. The third shaft, the deepest of the three and once an air ventilation shaft for Nelson's Coal Mine, was then uncapped. As it was subject to HM Inspectorate of Mines regulations it had to be checked for gas, and so late in the day the investigation was suspended. On Friday, 7 March 1975, after gas tests had been passed, police officers and mine rescue staff entered the third shaft. Accessed by a vertical ladder,  down on the first landing, a broken police torch was found from the previous day's work. A further  down on a second landing, a cassette tape recorder was found. A further  down on a third landing, the team found a rolled up sleeping bag that was acting as a pillow, a yellow foam mattress and a survival blanket. Whittle's body was found hanging from a steel wire, only  from the bottom of the shaft.

From all the items recovered from the three shafts which were later forensically inspected by the police, there was only one partial fingerprint, on the reporter's notepad. After four months of every other fingerprint investigation in the nation practically being put on hold, no match could be found.

Consequent actions
Chief Superintendent Bob Booth, who led the investigation into Whittle's kidnapping, was subsequently demoted from CID to a uniformed beat officer. DCI Walter Boreham later recalled that, although the Scotland Yard team finished up with several million handwritten index cards, as well as tens of thousands of statements and other documents, Home Office computer scientists were sceptical that computerising the case, then a rarity, would be an improvement. Alex Rennie, who was Chief Constable of West Mercia Police when Whittle was murdered, had all of the notes not used during the trial destroyed when he retired. Rennie, in retirement, later said:

Cause of Whittle's death and post mortem findings
It is widely believed that Neilson pushed Whittle off the ledge in the drainage shaft, strangling her. An alternative scenario is that Neilson was not present when Whittle died and that he fled on the night of the failed ransom collection without returning to the shaft, believing the police were closing in on him, leaving Whittle alive in the dark for a considerable period of time before she fell to her death.

Post-mortem examination showed that Whittle had not died from strangulation, but had died instantly from vagal inhibition. The shock of the fall had caused her heart to stop beating. The pathologist, Dr John Brown, reported that this would have been induced by high blood pressure in her carotid artery, caused by the constrictive wire loop around her neck triggering an alarm to her brain via the vagus nerve. The brain's response to this urgent signal for reduction in artery pressure would be to radically slow down the heart, and when that failed, her heart stopped altogether. The pathologist reported that Whittle weighed only 7 stone (98 lb or 44 kg) when found; her stomach and intestines were completely empty, she had lost a considerable amount of weight, and she was emaciated.

Arrest and conviction

Neilson subsequently became Britain's most wanted man. In December 1975, two police officers spotted a man seen acting suspiciously in Mansfield, who turned out to be Neilson. Although he was armed with a sawn-off shotgun, he was arrested with the help of several customers in a nearby fish and chip shop.

In the subsequent investigation, Neilson's fingerprints were found to match one of those in the drain shaft. In the interview at Kidsgrove police station when he confessed to Whittle's kidnapping, Neilson gave an 18-page statement to DCS Harold Wright, head of Staffordshire CID, and Commander Morrison of Scotland Yard, with the statement hand-written by DCI Walter Boreham.

During his trial at Oxford Crown Court, Neilson's defence lawyer suggested that Whittle had accidentally fallen from the ledge and had hanged herself, and that Neilson had cared for her, feeding her chicken soup, spaghetti and meatballs, and buying her fish and chips and chicken legs. In July 1976, Neilson was convicted of Whittle's murder, for which he was given a life sentence; and a total of 61 years (running concurrently, with the longest being 21 years) for other offences. Three weeks later he was convicted of the murder of three post office workers, and given three further life sentences. The offences regarding the shooting of security guard Gerald Smith were left on file, as Smith had died more than a year and a day after the shooting.

2008 appeal and Neilson's death
In 2008, Neilson was suffering from motor neurone disease and appealed against his sentence, requesting it be commuted to a maximum of 30 years. Mr Justice Teare ruled that he must never be released from prison, saying:

Neilson died in hospital, still serving his sentence, in December 2011.

See also
List of kidnappings
List of solved missing person cases
The Black Panther
Murder of Muriel McKay - the crime that gave Donald Neilson inspiration for the kidnap.

References

External links
BBC Shropshire, Audio slideshow: Lesley Whittle remembered

1970s missing person cases
1970s trials
1975 in England
1975 murders in the United Kingdom
Crime in Shropshire
Crime in Staffordshire
Whittle, Lesley
January 1975 crimes
January 1975 events in the United Kingdom
Kidnappings in the United Kingdom
Missing person cases in England
Murder in England
Murder trials
Trials in England
Violence against women in England